Stéphanie Szostak (born August 5, 1975) is a French actress who started her career in the early 2000s. Szostak is best known for having appeared in the films The Devil Wears Prada, Dinner for Schmucks, Iron Man 3, and R.I.P.D. Szostak starred in the USA Network original drama series Satisfaction and the ABC series A Million Little Things.

Personal life 
Szostak was raised in the suburbs of Paris, France. She moved to the United States to study business at the College of William & Mary in Williamsburg, Virginia, where she played on the women's varsity golf team. After graduating with a Bachelor of Science in marketing, she moved to New York City and worked for Chanel in marketing. She then switched to acting after taking acting classes.

Szostak's married name is Polish and is pronounced "Sho-stawk". She currently resides outside New York City with her husband, Britt Szostak, and two sons.

Filmography

References

External links
 

1975 births
French film actresses
Living people
Place of birth missing (living people)
French television actresses
Actresses from Paris
21st-century French actresses
William & Mary Tribe women's golfers